The Third Confession (German: Das Geständnis der Drei) is a 1929 German silent film directed by James Bauer and starring Hertha von Walther, Olaf Fjord and Harry Nestor.

The film's sets were designed by Robert A. Dietrich.

Cast
 Hertha von Walther 
 Olaf Fjord 
 Harry Nestor
 Betty Astor 
 Angelo Ferrari
 Franz Klebusch 
 Gyula Szőreghy
 Manfred Voss

References

Bibliography
 Gerhard Lamprecht. Deutsche Stummfilme: 1927-1931.

External links

1929 films
Films of the Weimar Republic
German silent feature films
Films directed by James Bauer
German black-and-white films